Rogue Rocket Games is an American video game developer formed in early 2011 by Nick Bruty and Rich Sun, both of whom previously worked at Planet Moon Studios. The company is located in San Francisco, California.

History
In April 2014, Nick Bruty announced that Rogue Rocket Games was working on a spiritual sequel to Giants: Citizen Kabuto called First Wonder; its Kickstarter was launched in September 2015. Funding for this project was later canceled by the project creator on October 17, 2015.

Games
The following games have been developed by Rogue Rocket Games.

References

Companies established in 2011
Video game companies established in 2011
Video game companies of the United States
Video game development companies